Daqiao is a town in Jiangdu District, Yangzhou, Jiangsu province, China. , it has 8 residential communities and 33 villages under its administration.

See also 
 List of township-level divisions of Jiangsu

References 

Township-level divisions of Jiangsu
Jiangdu District